The Dupuy de Lôme class was a group of two submarines built for the French Navy during World War I.

Ships

See also 
List of submarines of France

Notes

Bibliography

 

Submarine classes
World War I submarines of France
 
Ship classes of the French Navy